Thud is the first studio album by the rock artist Kevin Gilbert. It was released in 1995. The album was his last release before his accidental death in 1996.

Track listing

Some distributions of the album were also co-packaged with a bonus CD entitled "Kashmir & Thud EP" including five additional tracks:

Personnel
Kevin Gilbert - vocals, keyboards, guitars, bass, drums (5, 7), cello
Bill Bottrell - backing vocals, guitar (3), pedal steel guitar (7)
Brian MacLeod - drums, percussion
Dan Schwartz - bass (1, 3, 7, 8)
Robert Ferris - backing vocals (4, 6)
Skip Waring, Toby Holmes, Jay Mueller and Bruce Friedman - brass section (9)
Lyle Workman - electric guitar (2)

Additional personnel for Kashmir & Thud EP include:
Kevin Gilbert - vocals, guitars, bass, mic feedback (3), foot tambourine (4), arrangements (1)
Corky James - guitars (1), arrangements (1)
Dave Kerzner - mellotron (3), orchestron (1)
Nick D'Virgilio - drums (3), percussion (4)
Russ Parrish - guitars (3), bass (4)
Satnam Ramgotra - tabla (1)
T.A. Ronn - dobro (4)
Toss Panos - drums (1)

Trivia
The photography used as the front cover of Thud was taken by famous German surrealist photographer Herbert List. 
Two of the songs on Thud, namely "All Fall Down" and "Shrug (Because of Me and You)", were originally recorded by Giraffe and have been reworked by Kevin for this release.
The original title of "Shadow Self" is "Late for Dinner," which still appears on the Thud promo release. Gilbert said the track was renamed by mistake in a printing error.

References

External links
Thud on progarchives.com

1995 albums
Kevin Gilbert albums
Albums produced by Bill Bottrell